The discography of American singer Laura Branigan consists of seven studio albums, six compilation albums, 32 singles, four promotional singles, three video albums, and 14 music videos.

Albums

Studio albums

Compilation albums

Box sets

Extended plays

Singles

Promotional singles

Videos

Music videos

Other contributions

Notes

References

See also 
 List of songs recorded by Laura Branigan

External links 
 

Discographies of American artists
Pop music discographies
Disco discographies